Dawn Stensland Mendte  is an American television talk show host and news anchor working at WJLP-TV in Freehold, New Jersey, and on WPHT 1210 AM in Philadelphia.  She is also a past anchor of CBS Saturday Morning.  Stensland-Mendte has anchored the news at TV stations across the country including WBBM-TV in Chicago, KYW-TV and WTXF-TV in Philadelphia and WKYC-TV in Cleveland.  She is married to Larry Mendte, a radio talk show host, TV news commentator and news anchor.

Biography

Education

Born in Chicago, Illinois, her family moved quite a bit in her school years to Charlotte, North Carolina, Raleigh, North Carolina and Farmington, Minnesota, where Dawn graduated from Farmington High School.  Stensland-Mendte earned a B.A. in Journalism from the University of Minnesota, where she was president of the school's Society of Professional Journalists chapter.

Career 

Stensland started her television career at KSTP-TV in Minneapolis, when she earned the one paid internship that the station awards every year.  She was hired as a producer and anchor at WREX-TV in Rockford, Illinois, and at WKOW-TV in Madison, Wisconsin, where she also hosted the Sunday morning political talk show, "Capitol City Sunday."

She was the main anchor at WINK-TV in Fort Myers, Florida, before being hired by WBBM-TV, the CBS owned-and-operated station in Chicago, where she was an anchor and reporter. Next, she was hired by WKYC-TV in Cleveland to co-anchor the 6 and 11 o'clock newscasts.

Philadelphia 

Stensland-Mendte is best known for her anchoring in Philadelphia.  From 1997 to 2000, she co-anchored the 5 and 6 o'clock newscasts with Ukee Washington and Larry Kane at KYW-TV, CBS's Philadelphia outlet.  While she was at KYW-TV, Stensland-Mendte also co-hosted CBS News Saturday Morning with Russ Mitchell.  In 2000, she was hired by WTXF-TV, the Fox owned and operated station in Philadelphia, to be the main anchor.  Stensland-Mendte anchored the award winning, top rated 10 o'clock newscast for nearly a decade.

Since 2010, Stensland-Mendte has been the TV spokesperson for Dreambaby child safety products, manufactured by the Australian Company Tee-Zed.  In September, 2012, Stensland-Mendte started hosting her own talk show, "A New Dawn," on WMCN-TV, a ShopHQ-affiliated station with studios in Cherry Hill, New Jersey, a suburb of Philadelphia. In March, 2013 WMCN changed the name of the show to simply "Dawn."

Stensland-Mendte is now heard on WPHT talk radio as the news anchor of the Rich Zeoli morning show, and hosting the 10 a.m. to noon slot.  She can also be seen as a featured reporter and host on Jersey Matters, a public affairs show at WJLP-TV in Freehold, New Jersey.

Scandal 

Stensland-Mendte's husband Larry Mendte co-anchored at KYW-TV with Alycia Lane when she was fired for striking a New York City woman police officer and calling her a "dyke bitch" in December, 2007.  Lane then complained to the FBI that Mendte was looking at her emails.  Mendte pleaded guilty to one federal charge and admitted to a physical romance with Lane while his wife was going through a difficult pregnancy. He ended the romance when his wife found racy emails from Lane to Mendte.

In a public statement, Mendte says Lane then tried to get him fired and he looked at her emails to defend himself.  These details were reported on newscasts that Stensland-Mendte anchored.  When Mendte was sentenced, Dawn Stensland-Mendte took the stand, looked at Lane and said "there is nothing but sadness in our house."  The scandal was front page news in Philadelphia for more than a year and Stensland-Mendte was praised for her courage and for standing by her husband.

Congress 

In 2010, Stensland-Mendte made headlines in Philadelphia when she was approached to run as a Republican in Pennsylvania's 7th congressional district.  She would have run in a primary against Pat Meehan, who was the U.S. Attorney, overseeing the case against her husband.  After a flurry of new reports and columns, Stensland-Mendte decided not to run.

Family 

Stensland-Mendte has been married to Larry Mendte since 2000.  Together, they have two children, both sons; Michael was born in 2004, and David was born in 2006. She is also a step-mom to Mendte’s two adult children, Stacia and Jonathan, from a previous relationship.

References 

1964 births
Living people
American television journalists
American women television journalists
Journalists from Illinois
People from Chicago
People from Farmington, Minnesota
Television anchors from Cleveland
Television anchors from Philadelphia
21st-century American women